LA ink is a design firm established in 1987 and based in Minneapolis, MN. Most notable for their pioneering work in large scale printed murals and achievement recognition installations. Some key examples of their work are the SEGD 2007 Honor Award / AIA MN Award winning "Wall of Discovery" and the Northwest Airlines hangar mural at the Minneapolis-Saint Paul International Airport.

In 2008 LA ink completed work on thirteen large scale mosaic murals totaling over 3200' sq and fifty 4' x 10' hanging mobiles that decorate Macalester College's Leonard Center. Also in 2008 the firm's work on the Wall of Discovery was used as a case study in Jennifer and Ken Visocky O'Grady's "Information Design Handbook"

References 

Schnetzer, Jenny. "Taking Digital to New Heights." Signs of the Times Sept 1998: 116-117
"Airline Hangar Gets Digital Facelift." ScreenPrinting Nov 1998: 7
"Minneapolis firm Creates Massive Graphic for Twin Cities Airport" Micro Publishing News Midwest Edition Aug. 1998: N1, N14
Griffith, David A. "LA Ink Scouts Southland Site for Massive Airport Graphic" Micro Publishing News Southern California Aug. 1998: 14
"Persistence Pays Off" The Big Picture Jan.-Feb. 1999: 58,60
O'Grady, Jenn Visocky, and Ken Visocky O'Grady. The Information Design Handbook. Cincinnati, OH: How, 2008.
Peck, Gretchen. "Celebrating Diversity Through Art." Digital Output, XIV, NO. 12: 22
"Animierte Architektur." Page : 41.
Signweb Article
SEGD 2007 award page
AIA Minnesota award Page
LA ink home page

Design companies of the United States
Companies based in Minneapolis